Ashley Davies is a character in the TV series South of Nowhere.

Ashley Davies may also refer to:
Ashley Davies (squash player) (born 1995), English squash player
Ashley Davies (musician) in Wild Pumpkins at Midnight
Ashley Davies, a character in "The Daughters of Cain"

See also
Ashley Davis, American beauty pageant winner
Ashley Slanina-Davies (born 1989), actress